The year 1791 in architecture involved some significant architectural events and new buildings.

Events
 The elevations of Charlotte Square in Edinburgh, Scotland, are designed by Robert Adam.
 Polish architect Jakub Kubicki is ennobled.

Buildings and structures

Buildings opened

 January 6 – Théâtre Feydeau, Paris, designed by Jacques Legrand and Jacques Molinos.
 November 7 – The Custom House, Dublin, Ireland, designed by James Gandon.

Buildings completed
 Bara Imambara, Lucknow, India
 Brandenburg Gate, Berlin, Germany
 Clyne Castle, Swansea, Wales, built by Richard Phillips
 Gammel Køgegård, Køge, Denmark (main house)
 Buenos Aires Metropolitan Cathedral, Argentina (rebuilt)
 Plaza Mayor, Madrid, remodelling by Juan de Villanueva
 Rock Castle (Hendersonville, Tennessee), United States, home of Daniel Smith.
 Tower of Hercules (lighthouse) in Spain (remodelling)
 Dar Hassan Pacha (palace) in the Casbah of Algiers.</onlyinclude>

Births
 January 14 – Thomas Oliver, English neoclassical architect (died 1857)
 March 15 – Lewis Vulliamy, English architect (died 1871)
 April 17 (bapt.) – William Cubitt, English building and civil engineering contractor and politician (died 1863)
 June 7 – Giacomo Moraglia, Milanese neoclassical architect (died 1860)

Deaths
 December 19 – Jean-François de Neufforge, Flemish architect and engraver (born 1714)

References

Architecture
Years in architecture
18th-century architecture